Ramaval is a Village in Ghazipur District located in the Indian state of Uttar Pradesh.

References 

Dildarnagar
Dildarnagar Fatehpur
Cities and towns in Ghazipur district
Towns and villages in Kamsar